Josep Lladonosa i Giró (Alguaire, Province of Lleida; 1938), is a Catalan chef from the region of Lleida (Spain), and food-writer. He has been chef for fifty years. During this time he has also done a big research about cooking (techniques, products and recipes) and gastronomy (culture about or tied to eating) in Catalonia, which he has documented since the Middle Ages (as for example in his book Llibre de Sent Soví) and he has diffused it in a large number of books and articles. Some of them have been translated in some languages as Spanish, English, French, etc. He is a famous gastronomy teacher as well. He has collaborated with people as Joan Amades or Jaume Fàbrega. In 2003 he won the highest Catalan award given by the Generalitat de Catalunya, the Creu de Sant Jordi.

Some of his publications 
 Invasions i intents d'integració de la Vall d'Aran a França 
 La cuina de Catalunya 
 La cuina medieval catalana 
 La cuina catalana d'ahir i d'avui 
 El llibre de les sopes 
 El gran llibre de la caça 
 The book of the Catalan Kitchen 
 La cuina que torna (1982) 
 La cocina medieval (1984) 
 Cocina de ayer, delicias de hoy (1989) , 
 El gran libro de la cocina catalana (1991) 
 El llibre del guisats i les picades (1995) 
 El libro de los arroces (1996) 
 La cuina catalana més antiga (1998) 
 La cuina de dos grans mestres (2000) 
 Cocina catalana. Cocina regional (2000) , 
 The Book of Paellas: All the rice dishes at the famous restaurante "Set Portes" of Barcelona and others, seasoned with the gastronomical wisdom of its master chef (2000) 
 Livre des paellas: tous les riz du célebre restaurant "Set Portes" de Barcelone concoctés par son chef cuisinier, theoricien de la gastronomie (2001) 
 L'escudella (2002) 
 The Great Sweet Fruit Book. Cultivation, History And Cooking (2002) 
 Plats amb història: Vivències i opinions (2003) 
 La cuina ecològica (2004) 
 La cuina tradicional catalana a l'abast (2005) 
 Cent plats amb fruita (2006) 
 La cuina de les terres de Lleida (2006) 

1938 births
Living people
Chefs from Catalonia
Mediterranean cuisine
Catalan-language writers
Food writers from Catalonia
Spanish essayists
Spanish male writers
Male essayists